Karen Head is an American poet, educator and editor. She is a professor at the Georgia Institute of Technology where she is the executive director of the Communication Center. Head is known for her contributions to Massive Open Online Courses (MOOCs)

Head is also the editor of the international poetry journal, Atlanta Review. In April 2018, the Waffle House Foundation funded Head's poetry tour project for under-served Georgia high school students. Additionally, Head was declared Waffle House Poet Laureate. In 2020, she was named the inaugural Poet Laureate of Fulton County, Georgia.

Works

Books 
 Mother Mary Comes to Me: A Pop Culture Poetry Anthology (Madville Publishing, 2020)
 Lost on Purpose (Iris Press, 2019)
 Disrupt This!: MOOCs and the Promises of Technology (University Press of New England, 2017)
 On Occasion: Four Poets, One Year (Poetry Atlanta Press, 2014)
 Teaching as a Human Experience: An Anthology of Contemporary Poems (Cambridge Scholars Publishing, 2015)
 Sassing (WordTech Communications, 2009)
 My Paris Year (All Nations Press, 2009)
 Shadow Boxes: Poems and Prose Poems (All Nations Press, 2003)

References

1967 births
Georgia Tech faculty
Living people
21st-century American poets